Grevillea versicolor is a species of plant in the protea family that is endemic to Australia.

Description
The species grows as a shrub to about 1.5–3 m in height. The leaves are serrato-dentate (saw-toothed), 20–120 mm long by 25–80 mm wide. The flowers vary in colour from white through yellow to apricot, becoming reddish when fully open.

Distribution and habitat
The species has a very restricted distribution; it is known only from the Nabarlek area of Arnhem Land in the Top End of the Northern Territory, where it grows on sandy soils in open sclerophyll forest on the sandstone escarpment.

References

versicolor
Endemic flora of Australia
Flora of the Northern Territory
Taxa named by Donald McGillivray
Plants described in 1986
Proteales of Australia